Kaieteur is the world's largest single drop waterfall.  Located on the Potaro River in the Kaieteur National Park, it sits in a section of the Amazon rainforest included in the Potaro-Siparuni region of Guyana.  It is 226 metres (741 ft) high when measured from its plunge over a sandstone and conglomerate cliff to the first break. It then flows over a series of steep cascades that, when included in the measurements, bring the total height to 251 metres (822 ft). While many falls have greater height, few have the combination of height and water volume, and Kaieteur is among the most powerful waterfalls in the world with an average flow rate of 663 cubic metres per second (23,400 cubic feet per second).

Kaieteur Falls is about four and a half times the height of Niagara Falls, on the border between Canada and the United States, and about twice the height of Victoria Falls, on the border of Zambia and Zimbabwe in Africa.  It is a single drop waterfall.

Upriver from the falls, the Potaro Plateau stretches out to the distant escarpment of the Pakaraima Mountains.  The Potaro River empties into the Essequibo River which is the 34th longest river in South America and the longest river in Guyana.

History and discovery 
The falls were rediscovered by Europeans in 1870 by a party led by Charles Barrington Brown, a British geologist appointed as a government surveyor to the colony of British Guiana. Brown and his partner James Sawkins had arrived in Georgetown in 1867, and while they did some of their mapping and preparation of geological reports together, some work was performed in separate expeditions, and Sawkins was taking a break from his work at the time of Brown's discovery of Kaieteur. At this point, Brown did not have time to investigate Kaieteur Falls closely, so he returned one year later to make comprehensive measurements.

Brown’s book Canoe and Camp life in British Guiana was published in 1876. Two years later, in 1878, he published Fifteen Thousand Miles on the Amazon and its tributaries.

According to a Patamona Indian legend, Kaieteur Falls was named for Kai, a chief, or Toshao who acted to save his people by paddling over the falls in an act of self-sacrifice to Makonaima, the great spirit.

Another legend though was told to Brown by Amerindians in the night of discovery of falls: Kaieteur has been named after an unpleasant old man who was placed in a boat and shoved in the fall by his relatives. Thus, the fall was named "Kaieteur", which means "old-man-fall".

Tourism 
Kaieteur Falls is a major tourist attraction in Guyana. It is in Kaieteur National Park in the centre of Guyana's rainforest.

The park is served by Kaieteur International Airport, about a 15-minute walk from the top of Kaieteur falls, with frequent flights to Ogle Airport and Cheddi Jagan International Airport in Georgetown.

Popular culture
Kaieteur Falls is featured in:

 the documentary film The White Diamond by Werner Herzog and Animal Planet's River Monsters with Jeremy Wade.
 the science fiction animation television series G Gundam. The lead character trains and bathes under the falls before his final fight.
 the opening of the fourth season credits of the Discovery Channel's series "Gold Rush" (2013). It also features in the body of a few episodes of that season.
 episode 6 of David Attenborough's series Life on Earth in which the native frogs, which thrive in the moist conditions, are discussed.
 episode 1 of Steve Backshall's series Deadly Adventures where Steve abseils to the bottom and camps overnight.
 the ending of the final episode of the fourth season of River Monsters features the falls.
 Evelyn Waugh’s 1934 travel book, Ninety-two Days.

Gallery

See also
List of waterfalls by flow rate

References

External links 

Kaieteur National Park home to the Kaieteur Falls.
Kaieteur Falls
Kaieteur Falls at Beautiful World

Waterfalls of Guyana
Potaro-Siparuni
Tourist attractions in Guyana
Geological type localities
Superlatives